Sir John Richardson FRS FRSE (5 November 1787 – 5 June 1865) was a Scottish naval surgeon, naturalist and Arctic explorer.

Life
Richardson was born at Nith Place in Dumfries the son of Gabriel Richardson, Provost of Dumfries, and his wife, Anne Mundell. He was educated at Dumfries Grammar School. He was then apprenticed to his maternal uncle, Dr James Mundell, a surgeon in Dumfries.

He studied medicine at Edinburgh University, and became a surgeon in the navy in 1807. He traveled with John Franklin in search of the Northwest Passage on the Coppermine Expedition of 1819–1822. Richardson wrote the sections on geology, botany and ichthyology for the official account of the expedition.

Franklin and Richardson returned to Canada in 1825 and went overland by fur trade routes to the mouth of the Mackenzie River. Franklin was to go as far west as possible and Richardson was to go east to the mouth of the Coppermine River.  These were the only known points on the central coast and had been reached in 1793 and 1771 respectively. He had with him two specially-built boats which were more ocean-worthy than the voyageur canoes used by Franklin on his previous expedition. They gave their names to the Dolphin and Union Strait near the end of his route.

His journey was successful and he reached his furthest east the same day that Franklin reached his furthest west (16 August 1826). He abandoned his boats at Bloody Falls and trekked overland to Fort Franklin which he reached three weeks before Franklin. Together they had surveyed  of previously unmapped coast. The natural history discoveries of this expedition were so great that they had to be recorded in two separate works, the Flora Boreali-Americana (1833–40), written by William Jackson Hooker, and the Fauna Boreali-Americana (1829–37), written by Richardson, William John Swainson, John Edward Gray and William Kirby.

Richardson was knighted by Queen Victoria in 1846. He traveled with John Rae on an unsuccessful search for Franklin in 1848–49, describing it in An Arctic Searching Expedition (1851).

He retired to the Lake District in 1855.

He died at his home Lancrigg House north of Grasmere on 5 June 1865, and is buried at St Oswald's Church, Grasmere.

Family
He married three times: firstly in 1818 to Mary Stiven; secondly in 1833 to Mary Booth; and finally in 1847 to Mary Fletcher.

Works
He also wrote accounts dealing with the natural history, and especially the ichthyology, of several other Arctic voyages, and was the author of Icones Piscium (1843), Catalogue of Apodal Fish in the British Museum (1856), the second edition of Yarrell's History of British Fishes (1860), The Polar Regions (1861). and Arctic Ordeal: The Journal of John Richardson Edited by C. Stuart Houston (1984). The National Marine Biological Library at the Marine Biological Association retains some original illustrations used by Richardson in preparation for the second edition of Yarrell's book.

Taxon named in his honor

Reptiles
Richardson is commemorated in the scientific names of four species of reptiles: 
Eremiascincus richardsonii, 
Hemidactylus richardsonii, 
Myron richardsonii, and Sphaerodactylus richardsonii.

Mammals
The mammal species 
Mustela richardsonii, 
Urocitellus richardsonii, and 
Dicrostonyx richardsoni are also named for him.

Plants 
There is also a flowering plant, Boykinia richardsonii, commonly known as Richardson's brookfoam, less commonly as Richardson's boykinia or Richardson's saxifrage.

Fish
Diaphus richardsoni Tåning, 1932, is a species of lanternfish found worldwide.

Taxon described by him
See :Category:Taxa named by John Richardson (naturalist)

References

External links

19th-century explorers
1787 births
1865 deaths
Alumni of the University of Edinburgh
Scottish polar explorers
Explorers of the Arctic
Fellows of the Royal Society
Knights Bachelor
People from Dumfries
Royal Medal winners
Royal Navy Medical Service officers
Royal Navy personnel of the Napoleonic Wars
Scottish biologists
Scottish explorers
Scottish naturalists
Scottish nature writers
Scottish ornithologists
Scottish surgeons
People from Grasmere (village)